Tyrone Davis (1938–2005) was an American blues and soul singer.

Tyrone Davis may also refer to:

 Tyrone Davis (American football) (1972–2022),  American football player
 Tyrone Davis, reality TV contestant on American series Survivor: Nicaragua
 Tyrone Davis Jr., fictional police officer from U.S. TV series Third Watch, played by Coby Bell